Daphne Anne Angela Pleasence (born 30 September 1941) is an English actress. Trained in theatre, Pleasence's first major film role came in Hitler: The Last Ten Days (1973), followed by roles in horror films such as From Beyond the Grave and Symptoms (1974). 

She worked extensively in television productions and British miniseries throughout the 1980s and 1990s. She had minor roles in the films The Search for John Gissing (2001), Gangs of New York (2002), and The Gigolos (2005).

Biography
Pleasence was born in Chapeltown, Sheffield, West Riding of Yorkshire, to Miriam Raymond and actor Donald Pleasence. She studied at the Royal Academy of Dramatic Art, and made her stage debut in 1964 as Titania in a production of A Midsummer Night's Dream at the Birmingham Repertory Theatre. She appeared extensively in London theatre productions throughout the 1970s.

She is known for her performance as Catherine Howard in the 1970 BBC serial The Six Wives of Henry VIII. Other television credits include Dixon of dock green 'Alice' 1976 Les Misérables, The Barchester Chronicles (alongside her father), Mansfield Park, Silas Marner, Midsomer Murders, Whitechapel, Agatha Christie's Poirot and Agatha Christie's Marple. In 1978, she voiced the role of Ophelia in a BBC radio play production of Rosencrantz and Guildenstern Are Dead. 

She is also noted for her roles in horror films of the 1970s, including From Beyond the Grave, Symptoms and The Godsend. She made a guest appearance in the parody series Dr. Terrible's House of Horrible satirising her earlier performances. 

She has also appeared as the Ghost of Christmas Past in the 1984 holiday television film A Christmas Carol, Sister Cecilia in Stealing Heaven (1988), a crowd member in Martin Scorsese's 2002 crime drama Gangs of New York, Elizabeth I in the 2007 Doctor Who episode "The Shakespeare Code", and Winnie in the BBC drama Happy Valley (2016).

Filmography

References

Bibliography

External links
 

1941 births
Alumni of RADA
English film actresses
English television actresses
Living people
People from Ecclesfield
People educated at St Mary's Town and Country School
Actresses from Sheffield
20th-century English actresses
21st-century English actresses